RCAF Station Neepawa was a Second World War British Commonwealth Air Training Plan (BCATP) station located near Neepawa, Manitoba, Canada. It was operated and administered by the Royal Canadian Air Force (RCAF).

History

World War II
RCAF Station Neepawa was originally opened by the Royal Air Force on 30 March 1942 near the community of Neepawa, Manitoba.  On the 24th of August of that year it was taken over by the Moncton Flying Club. RCAF Station Neepawa was originally home to No. 35 Elementary Flying Training School (No. 35 E.F.T.S.). On 30 Jan 1944, No. 35 E.F.T.S. was re-designated No. 26 E.F.T.S. RCAF Station Neepawa was closed on 25 August 1944.

The Station was constructed as a component of the British Commonwealth Air Training Plan

Aerodrome
Three runways were listed as follows:

Relief landing field – Eden
The primary Relief Landing Field (R1) for RCAF Station Neepawa was located east of the unincorporated community of Eden, Manitoba. The relief field consisted of an aircraft hangar, a small landing strip and a maintenance shop.

Present Day
The airport is now operating as the Neepawa Airport

References

Neepawa
Buildings and structures in Manitoba
Military airbases in Manitoba
Military history of Manitoba
1942 establishments in Manitoba